Lenka Reinerová (17 May 1916 – 27 June 2008) was an author from the Czech Republic who wrote exclusively in German. She was born in Prague.

Life 
Reinerová grew up in a German-speaking Jewish family, her mother a German-Bohemian from Saaz (Žatec) and her father an ironware dealer from Prague. Prior to World War II, she worked as a translator, an interpreter and an editor for the Arbeiter-Illustrierte-Zeitung. She fled to Paris in 1938 and later travelled to Morocco. She was visiting Mexico with the communist and writer Egon Erwin Kisch in March 1939 and was the only member of her family to survive the Holocaust. She returned to Czechoslovakia after 1948. In the 1950s, she was jailed by Czechoslovak communist authorities and spent 15 months in prison; she recorded this experience in one of her novels, Alle Farben der Sonne und der Nacht. After her release she published sporadically. In 1968 she was the Editor in Chief of the English language publication 'Czechoslovak Life' published by the Orbis Publishing House in Prague. From the summer of 1968, and throughout the period following the Warsaw Pact invasion, Czechoslovak Life continued to support the Action Programme of the Communist Party. She remained as Editor in Chief until at least the end of 1969. Later  she was not allowed to publish at all until the fall of communism. Her works are mostly published at Aufbau Verlagsgruppe, Berlin.

On 25 January 2008, a speech Reinerová wrote but could not longer deliver personally due to ill health was read in German parliament in the course of an hour of remembrance for the victims of the Third Reich.

Reinerová had been largely a recluse ever since a spell in hospital in 2007, with the cause of her death not immediately known. 
Reinerová, the oldest living German-language writer in Prague, died on 27 June 2008 in Prague, in her apartment, at 92. Lucie Cernhousova, head of Literaturhaus, the Prague publisher of  German-language writers, disclosed her death.

Awards
In 1999, she was awarded the Schiller Prize. In 2003, she won the prestigious Goethe Medal.

References

External links 
 The Times: Lenka Reinerova: the last survivor of the "Prague German" writers
 

1916 births
2008 deaths
Czechoslovak writers
Czech Jews
Czech writers in German
Writers from Prague
German Bohemian people
Recipients of Medal of Merit (Czech Republic)
Commanders Crosses of the Order of Merit of the Federal Republic of Germany